Xie Ke (born 14 January 2000) is a Chinese professional Go player.

Career
Xie became a professional 1 dan in 2013, finishing in first place in the pro qualification tournament.

In 2017, he finished in the top four in the 3rd MLily Cup, after being eliminated by Park Junghwan in the semifinal.

In a series of games played by Chinese Go AI "Golaxy" against 41 top Go players in 2018, Xie won his game against Golaxy. This was the only victory by a human player; Golaxy finished the series with a 40–1 win–loss record. Golaxy played as White with no komi.

In 2021, he became a finalist in both the MLily Cup and Ing Cup; reaching the finals in two major international Go tournaments earned him promotion to 9 dan. He finished as the runner-up in the MLily Cup, with a 3–2 loss to Mi Yuting in the finals. As of February 2023, the finals of the Ing Cup have not yet been played.

References

External links 
Xie Ke on Go Ratings

2000 births
Living people
Chinese Go players
Sportspeople from Ningbo